Statistics of J.League Division 2 in the 2001 season.

Overview
It was contested by 12 teams, and Kyoto Purple Sanga won the championship.

Final table

References

J2 League seasons
2
Japan
Japan